This is a list of United States Marine Corps regiments, sorted by status and number, with the current or most-recent type and division. Some of the inactive regiments are succeeded by active battalions.

Active

1st Marine Division

1st Marine Logistics Group

2nd Marine Division

2nd Marine Logistics Group

3rd Marine Division

3rd Marine Logistics Group

4th Marine Division (Reserve)

4th Marine Logistics Group

Other regiments

List of active regiments by type and number

Infantry

1st Marine Regiment
2nd Marine Regiment
3rd Marine Regiment
4th Marine Regiment
5th Marine Regiment
6th Marine Regiment
7th Marine Regiment
23rd Marine Regiment
25th Marine Regiment

Artillery

10th Marine Regiment
11th Marine Regiment
12th Marine Regiment
14th Marine Regiment

Logistics
 Combat Logistics Regiment 1
 Combat Logistics Regiment 2
 Combat Logistics Regiment 3
 Combat Logistics Regiment 4
 Combat Logistics Regiment 17
 Combat Logistics Regiment 27
 Combat Logistics Regiment 37
 Combat Logistics Regiment 45

Other

Marine Corps Security Force Regiment
Marine Raider Regiment
 Recruit Training Regiment, MCRD Parris Island, SC
Recruit Training Regiment, MCRD San Diego, CA
Wounded Warrior Regiment

Inactive

5th Marine Division

6th Marine Division

Other decommissioned regiments

Notes

See also
 List of United States Marine Corps aircraft groups

References

Regiments